Nasir Uddin Khan (Bengali: নাসির উদ্দিন খান) is a Bangladeshi actor known for portraying Alen Shwapon in the television series Syndicate . He also acted in criticality acclaimed series like Mohanagar and Taqdeer.

Early life
Nasir Uddin Khan was born in Chattogram. His father's name is Monu Meah Shordar and his mother's name is Ambia Khatun.

Career
He started his acting career as a theatre artist in 1995 in Chittagong. He continued acting in the theatre till 2015. In 2016, he moved to Dhaka to work in film and television. In 2020, he made his OTT debut through Taqdeer. But he got a major breakthrough by portraying Kaiser in Mohanagar. In 2022, he acted on Hawa. In October 2022, he appeared as the coach of Shwadhin Bangla Football Team in Damal.

Filmography

Film

Television

Friday (2023)

References

External links

1972 births
Living people
People from Chittagong
21st-century Bangladeshi male actors
Bangladeshi male film actors
Bangladeshi male stage actors
Bangladeshi male television actors